Ricardo Azevedo Alves (born 2 December 2001) is a Swiss footballer who plays for St. Gallen.

Club career
On 23 August 2022, Azevedo signed a two-year contract with St. Gallen.

Personal life
Born in Switzerland, Azevedo is of Portuguese descent.

References

2001 births
Footballers from Geneva
Swiss people of Portuguese descent
Living people
Swiss men's footballers
Switzerland youth international footballers
Association football defenders
Servette FC players
FC St. Gallen players
Swiss Super League players
Swiss Promotion League players
2. Liga Interregional players